Allargentum is a mineral from the class of antimonides, superclass of sulfides and sulfosalts (sometimes ascribed to the natural elements and alloys class), with formula written as Ag1−xSbx, where x = 0.09–0.16. This moderately rare mineral is found in silver ores and is therefore named from the Greek ἄλλος (allos, "another") and the Latin argentum ("silver"). Its Vickers hardness is 172–203.

References

Sulfide minerals
Sulfosalt minerals
Antimonide minerals
Silver minerals
Alloys
Hexagonal minerals
Minerals in space group 194